The De Soto Trail Regional Library System is a public library system serving the counties of Mitchell, Baker and Early, in the state Georgia.
The headquarters of the library system is the Camilla Public Library located in Camilla, Georgia.

is a member of PINES, a program of the Georgia Public Library Service that covers 53 library systems in 143 counties of Georgia. Any resident in a PINES supported library system has access to the system's collection of 10.6 million books. The library is also serviced by GALILEO, a program of the University System of Georgia which stands for "GeorgiA LIbrary LEarning Online". This program offers residents in supported libraries access to over 100 databases indexing thousands of periodicals and scholarly journals. It also boasts over 10,000 journal titles in full text.

History

Pelham Carnegie Library
Looking to establish a public library in the town of Pelham, a library committee was formed and Andrew Carnegie was petitioned for funds to construct the building. On December 10, 1906, the Carnegie foundation allowed Pelham $10,000 to construct their public library on the condition the town pay an annual upkeep of 10% of the funded price. On January 13, 1907, the library committee agreed to the terms set forth by Carnegie and began construction of the building. The library was dedicated on July 1, 1908, and by 1911 had grown to hold a collection of 3,000 volumes with access to magazines and other periodicals all for free for use by the general public.

The Pelham Carnegie building is one of the few original Carnegie libraries in the state of Georgia which hasn't undergone changes to the interior or exterior. Short of electrical repair in 1965 the library looks and functions much like it did when it first opened in 1908. Because of its  historical significance and accuracy it is listed within the Pelham Commercial Historic District, a National Register Historic District.

Branches

Library systems in neighboring counties
Kinchafoonee Regional Library System to the north.
Dougherty County Public Library to the north.
Worth County Library System to the north east.
Moultrie-Colquitt County Library System to the east.
Thomas County Public Library System to the south east.
Roddenbery Memorial Library to the south.
Southwest Georgia Regional Library to the south.

References

External links
PINES Catalog

County library systems in Georgia (U.S. state)
Public libraries in Georgia (U.S. state)